Icariella is a monotypic genus of Balkan dwarf spiders containing the single species, Icariella hauseri. It was first described by Paolo Marcello Brignoli in 1979, and has been found only in Greece.

See also
 List of Linyphiidae species (I–P)

References

Linyphiidae
Monotypic Araneomorphae genera
Taxa named by Paolo Brignoli